Joseph Salmon may refer to:
 Joseph Salmon (writer), English religious and political writer
 Joseph Salmon (publisher), British bookseller, postcard publisher and printer, the founder of J Salmon Ltd

See also
 J Salmon Ltd, UK-based printing and publishing firm
 Joe Salmon, Irish hurler